The 2019 IFAGG World Cup series in Aesthetic Group Gymnastics is a series of competitions officially organized and promoted by the International Federation of Aesthetic Group Gymnastics.

Formats

Medal winners

World Cup

Challenge Cup

Final ranking

World Cup

Challenge Cup

Note: Only three best results count.

Overall medal table

See also
 2019 World Aesthetic Group Gymnastics Championships

References

External links
Official Site

Aesthetic Group Gymnastics World Cup
2019 in gymnastics